The 2003 Nigerian Senate election in Kogi State was held on April 12, 2003, to elect members of the Nigerian Senate to represent Kogi State. Tunde Ogbeha representing Kogi West, Mohammed Ohiare representing Kogi Central and Nicholas Ugbane representing Kogi East all won on the platform of the Peoples Democratic Party.

Overview

Summary

Results

Kogi West 
The election was won by Tunde Ogbeha of the Peoples Democratic Party.

Kogi Central 
The election was won by Mohammed Ohiare of the Peoples Democratic Party.

Kogi East 
The election was won by Nicholas Ugbane of the Peoples Democratic Party.

References 

April 2003 events in Nigeria
Kogi State Senate elections
Kog